Michael James Busby (born December 27, 1972) is an American former professional baseball pitcher, who played in Major League Baseball (MLB) for the St. Louis Cardinals.

References

External links

Mike Busby at Pura Pelota (Venezuelan Professional Baseball League)

1972 births
Living people
Arizona League Cardinals players
Arkansas Travelers players
Baseball players from California
Camden Riversharks players
Indianapolis Indians players
Louisville Redbirds players
Major League Baseball pitchers
Memphis Redbirds players
Nashua Pride players
People from Lomita, California
Salt Lake Buzz players
Savannah Cardinals players
Sioux City Explorers players
St. Louis Cardinals players
St. Petersburg Cardinals players
Tiburones de La Guaira players
American expatriate baseball players in Venezuela